John Black (August 11, 1800 – August 29, 1854) was a politician from the U.S. state of Mississippi, most notably serving in the United States Senate as a Whig from 1832 to 1838.

Biography
Black was born in Massachusetts, and became a teacher. He then moved to Louisiana, where he practiced law. After moving to Mississippi, he was elected a judge in 1826, eventually being elected to the Mississippi Supreme Court. In 1832, Governor Charles Lynch appointed him as a Jacksonian, the forerunner of the modern Democratic Party, to fill the vacancy left by Powhatan Ellis. He ran for the seat in his own right as an anti-Jacksonian (later Whig) and served from November 22, 1833 to January 22, 1838, when he resigned.

During his time in office, he served as the chairman of the U.S. Senate Committee on Private Lands. After leaving the Senate, he moved to Winchester, Virginia, where he resumed practicing law until his death.

Like many southern United States politicians of his day, Black was a slave owner.

See also
List of justices of the Supreme Court of Mississippi

References

External links

1854 deaths
People from Massachusetts
Louisiana lawyers
Justices of the Mississippi Supreme Court
United States senators from Mississippi
Politicians from Winchester, Virginia
Virginia lawyers
Mississippi National Republicans
Mississippi Whigs
19th-century American politicians
Mississippi Jacksonians
Whig Party United States senators
1800 births